Prince Mark Boley is a Liberian footballer who plays as a midfielder or forward. He represents Liberia at the international level.

Club career
In 2010, Boley joined Kaya FC in the United Football League. He transferred to Stallion FC during the 2012 UFL season.

International career
In 2013, Boley accepted the call to play for the Liberian national team in the qualifying rounds of the 2014 FIFA World Cup. He made his international debut for Liberia in the Confederation of African Football second round qualification for the 2014 FIFA World Cup on 7 September 2013 against the Angola national team.

Legal Issues
On 17 July 2019, Boley was convicted in Providence, Rhode Island of lying to immigration officials and providing false information on immigration documents. Boley had entered the United States on 24 July 2015, and had married a Rhode Island woman in an attempt to receive permanent resident status. Boley is scheduled to be sentenced in District Court on 27 November 2019.

References

External links

Liberian footballers
Liberia international footballers
Liberian expatriate footballers
1989 births
Living people
Association football midfielders
Feni SC players